Njambi McGrath is a Kenyan-British comedian and actor.

Background
McGrath was born in Kenya. She grew up in Riara Ridge, near Limuru. She later moved to the United Kingdom and then to New York, where she met her husband, Dave. She speaks English, Swahili and Gikuyu. McGrath lives with her husband and two daughters in Ealing.

Career
McGrath has performed annually at the Edinburgh Fringe since 2013. Her 2020 memoir Through the Leopard's Gaze, published by Jacaranda Books, was optioned by Expectation Entertainment.

Awards
McGrath reached the final heat of the 2013 BBC New Comedy Awards and the first heat of the 2014 competition. She was nominated for Best Female Newcomer at the 2013 Black Comedy Awards. She won the 2019 NATYS: New Acts of the Year Show.

Radio
Becoming Njambi (2021) - BBC Radio 4
The Good, The Bad And The Unexpected (2020) - BBC Radio Scotland
Breaking the News (2019) - BBC Radio Scotland

Filmography
What the Frick (2020) - Imani

Bibliography
Through the Leopard's Gaze (2020) - memoir

References

External links 

Living people
Year of birth missing (living people)
British people of Kenyan descent
21st-century English comedians
Black British women comedians
Black British actresses